Uxbridge is a London Underground station in Uxbridge in the London Borough of Hillingdon, West London. The station is the terminus of the Uxbridge branches of both the Metropolitan line and the Piccadilly line. The next station towards London is Hillingdon. The station is 15.5 miles (25 km) west of Charing Cross and is in Travelcard Zone 6. The closest station on the Chiltern Line and Central line is West Ruislip, accessible by the U1 and U10 buses. The closest station on the Elizabeth line is West Drayton, accessible by the U1, U3, U5 and 222 buses. Uxbridge was formerly the terminus of a branch of the District line which ran from Ealing Common; the Piccadilly line took over in 1933.

History 
The Harrow and Uxbridge Railway (later merged into the Metropolitan Railway) first opened a station in Uxbridge on 4 July 1904 on Belmont Road, a short distance to the north of the existing station. The station was situated on a different track alignment, now used as sidings. The original service from central London was provided by steam-drawn trains but electrification took place the following year.

The London United Tramways extension from Shepherd's Bush was opened a few weeks before the underground station. The manager, as reported in a local newspaper at the time, commented on the high prices of the underground journey: "The tram journey took well over an hour to reach Shepards Bush".

On 1 March 1910, an extension of the District line from South Harrow to connect with the Metropolitan Railway at Rayners Lane was opened, enabling District line trains to serve stations between Rayners Lane and Uxbridge. The original Belmont Road station had two platforms, and after the introduction of shared operation one platform was used by each line.

On 23 October 1933 District line services to Uxbridge were replaced by Piccadilly line trains.

On 4 December 1938 the current station was opened on a new alignment.

On 12 January 1983, the station buildings were given Grade II listed status.

The London Borough of Hillingdon announced in June 2011 that it would be lobbying Transport for London to have the Central line diverted from West Ruislip station to Uxbridge. Such a project would require a business case approved by TfL and the completion of signal upgrade work on the Metropolitan line.

Design 

The station was designed by Charles Holden with L H Bucknell and features a red-brick facade with paired sculptures by Joseph Armitage over the entrance, representing stylised "winged wheels" with leaf springs. A tall concrete canopy arches over the tracks with a row of clerestory windows above the platforms. The canopy at Uxbridge is similar to the one at Cockfosters, the terminus at the other end of the Piccadilly line. The station is below street level in a cutting.

The stained glass panels by Erwin Bossanyi at the booking hall end of the platforms reflect the area's heraldic associations. The crown and three seaxes on a red background are the arms of Middlesex County Council and the chained swan on a black and red background is associated with Buckinghamshire. The centre shield is possibly the arms of the local Basset family; a downward-pointing red triangle on a gold background was borrowed from the Bassett arms for use on the arms of Uxbridge Urban District Council in 1948.

The forecourt of the new station was originally laid out to provide a turning circle for trolleybuses, which replaced trams in 1936. Ticket barriers are in operation.

Services

Metropolitan line 
The Metropolitan Line is the only line to operate an express service, though currently for Metropolitan Line trains on the Uxbridge branch this is eastbound only in the morning peaks (06:30 to 09:30) Monday to Friday.

The off-peak service in trains per hour (tph) is:
 8tph to Aldgate (all stations)
 8tph terminating at Uxbridge

The morning peak service in trains per hour (tph) is:
 2tph to Aldgate (semi-fast)
 4tph to Aldgate (all stations)
 4tph to Baker Street (all stations)
 10tph terminating at Uxbridge

The evening peak service in trains per hour (tph) is:
 7tph to Aldgate (all stations)
 3tph to Baker Street (all stations)
 10tph terminating at Uxbridge

Piccadilly line 
The off-peak service in trains per hour (tph) is:
 3tph to Cockfosters
 3tph terminating at Uxbridge

The peak time service in trains per hour (tph) is:
 6tph to Cockfosters
 6tph terminating at Uxbridge

Connections 

London Buses routes 222, 331, 427, 607, A10, U1, U2, U3, U4, U5, U7, U9, U10 and night route N207 serve the station. These provide connections with areas such as Acton, Cowley, Cranford, Denham, Ealing, Hanwell, Harefield, Harmondsworth, Hayes, Heathrow Airport, Hillingdon, Hounslow, Ickenham, Northwood, Ruislip, Shepherd's Bush, Sipson, Southall, West Drayton and White City.

In addition, non-London Buses routes serving the station are Carousel Buses routes 101, 102 and 104 to Beaconsfield and High Wycombe/Heathrow Airport, 581 to Higher Denham, 583 to Iver; First Berkshire route 3 to Slough and Green Line Coaches route 724 between Harlow and Heathrow Airport.

See also 
Uxbridge High Street railway station
Uxbridge Vine Street railway station

References

External links 

 Departure board for Uxbridge station
 The Uxbridge Parish website
 London Transport Photographic Archive
 
 
 
 
 

Charles Holden railway stations
Former Metropolitan Railway stations
Metropolitan line stations
Piccadilly line stations
Railway stations in Great Britain opened in 1904
Tube stations in the London Borough of Hillingdon
Art Deco architecture in London
Grade II listed buildings in the London Borough of Hillingdon
Grade II listed railway stations
Tube station